The men's 1500 metres T13 event at the 2020 Summer Paralympics in Tokyo took place on 31 August 2021.

Records
Prior to the competition, the existing records were as follows:

Results
The final took place on 31 August 2021, at 9:48:

References

Men's 1500 metres T13
2021 in men's athletics